Alexander Montgomerie, 10th Earl of Eglinton (10 February 172325 October 1769), was a Scottish peer.

Eglinton was the son of The 9th Earl of Eglinton. His mother, who was the third wife of the 9th Earl, was Susanna, Countess of Eglinton, the society beauty. He was the Grand Master Mason of the Grand Lodge of Scotland from 1750 to 1751.

Lord Eglinton was one of the first of the Scottish landowners to carry out improvements on his estates. He planned and built the conservation village of Eaglesham, Renfrewshire, in 1769 around the basic plan of a capital 'A'. The Earl introduced the young James Boswell to the joys of London society in the early 1760s, and figures prominently in Boswells London Journal, 1762-63.

The Earl was shot on the beach near his own estate of Ardrossan by an excise officer or Gaudger (Scots) named Mungo Campbell on 24 October 1769 following a dispute about the latter's right to bear arms on the Earl's grounds. The Earl died from his abdominal wounds late that evening. Campbell was convicted of murder but died by his own hand before the sentence could be carried out.

References

External links
 Alexander Montgomerie (1723–1769) at James Boswell – a Guide

1723 births
1769 deaths
10
East Renfrewshire
Scottish murder victims
People murdered in Scotland
Deaths by firearm in Scotland
Scottish representative peers
Eaglesham
Clan Montgomery